The 1997 Ohio Valley Conference men's basketball tournament was the final event of the 1996–97 season in the Ohio Valley Conference. The tournament was held February 25–March 1, 1997, at Nashville Arena in Nashville, Tennessee.

Murray State defeated  in the championship game, 88–85 in OT, to win their seventh overall OVC men's basketball tournament.

The Racers received an automatic bid to the 1997 NCAA tournament as the No. 15 seed in the Southeast region.

Format
Eight of the ten conference members participated in the tournament field. They were seeded based on regular season conference records, with play beginning in the quarterfinal round.  and  did not participate.

Bracket

References

Ohio Valley Conference men's basketball tournament
Tournament
Ohio Valley Conference men's basketball tournament
Ohio Valley Conference men's basketball tournament